{{DISPLAYTITLE:C8H20N2}}
The molecular formula C8H20N2 (molar mass: 144.26 g/mol, exact mass: 144.1626 u) may refer to:

 Octamoxin
 Octamethylenediamine(OMDA)

Molecular formulas